Hendra is the second studio album released by the English singer, author and multi-instrumentalist Ben Watt on 15 April 2014 through Unmade Road, under exclusive license to Caroline International. The record is a collaboration with Bernard Butler and features a guest-appearance by David Gilmour on slide guitar and backing vocals on "The Levels".

This is Watt's first solo album for three-decades since his 1983's debut, North Marine Drive.

During an interview in 2014, Watt stated the following regarding the album's title:"My sister died just shortly after finishing my last book and it was a big shock. She’d led a very simple life as a shopkeeper at a simple village store and lived quite a claustrophobic life. Whenever she’d try to get away she went to this little house on the edge of Cornwall called Hendra. When she died I did some research on the name and found that it’s an old Cornish word for home. It had this odd lyrical quality to it. When I found the actual meaning it seemed like the perfect title for the record."

Track listing

Bonus tracks (Deluxe Edition)

References

2014 albums
Caroline Records albums
Ben Watt albums